Garbajosa is a Spanish surname. Notable people with the surname include:

 Jorge Garbajosa (born 1977), Spanish basketball player
 Xavier Garbajosa (born 1976), French rugby player

Spanish-language surnames